Jupiter Calling may refer to:

Jupiter Calling (album), a 2017 album by The Corrs
"Jupiter Calling", a 1997 song by Per Gessle
"Jupiter Calling", a cover by the Leningrad Cowboys, released from the album Go Space as a single